Tell the Truth is the eighth studio album by Billy Squier that was released in March 4, 1993 and his most recent rock album to date. It contains the song "Angry", which became a modest, and his last, radio hit. It was not supported by Capitol Records, causing Squier to walk away from the music industry for several years. 

In the US, the disc failed to chart and sold less than 40,000 copies, according to Nielsen SoundScan, making it one of Squier's poorest selling albums.

Track listing 
All songs written by Billy Squier.

 "Angry" (4:30)
 "Tryin' to Walk a Straight Line" (4:05)
 "Rhythm (A Bridge So Far)" (7:01)
 "Hercules" (4:43)
 "Lovin' You Ain't So Hard" (5:18)
 "Time Bomb" (6:56)
 "Stranger to Myself" (5:54)
 "The Girl's All Right" (4:09)
 "Break Down" (4:48)
 "Not a Color" (5:13)
 "Mind Machine" (3:59)
 "Shocked Straight" (4:06)

References

1993 albums
Billy Squier albums
Capitol Records albums
Albums produced by Mike Chapman